According to the Book of Mormon, Mosiah II, King Benjamin's son and Mosiah I's grandson, was king of the Nephite nation from about 124 BC to 91 BC. The Book of Mosiah is named after Mosiah II. Mosiah was also a prophet and is described by Ammon as a "seer" who could translate records.

Accounts
Mosiah instituted a new governing system after all of his sons declined to succeed him as king, choosing rather to preach the gospel. This new government was based on judges elected and chosen by the people. After Mosiah's death in approximately 91 BC, this council of elected judges constituted the government of the land until Christ visited the Nephite nation (see ).

Possible origin of the name 
Mosiah II was presumably named after his grandfather.

Hugh Nibley relates the name to a combination of the name Moses with that of Yahweh (Jehovah).

The Egyptian root msy, "child of", has been considered as a possible etymology for the name Moses, arguably an abbreviation of a theophoric name, as for example in Egyptian names like Thutmoses (Thoth created him) and Ramesses (Ra created him), with the god's name omitted. In the case of Mosiah, the inversion of the elements could yield the combination "son of Yah".

The name is also similar to Isaiah in the Hebrew Bible, and the "-iah" suffix can be found in a number of Book of Mormon names such as Amalickiah and Sariah, as well as the Biblical names Jeremiah and Zedekiah.

Sons of Mosiah
The sons of Mosiah is the collective name used in the Book of Mormon for four sons of King  Mosiah II, whose names were Ammon, Aaron, Omner, and Himni.  These sons were notable for their initial opposition to the church, their miraculous repentance and conversion to Christ.  They subsequently served as missionaries among the Lamanites, accompanied by their friends Muloki and Ammah.

References

Further reading

Book of Mormon people
Seership in Mormonism